Master Quest may refer to:
Pokémon: Master Quest, the 5th season of Pokémon
The Legend of Zelda: Ocarina of Time Master Quest